C. berlandieri may refer to:

Chenopodium berlandieri, a species of plant in the family Amaranthaceae
Citharexylum berlandieri, a species of plant in the family Verbenaceae

See also
Berlandieri (disambiguation)